Sir Amos Meredith, 1st Baronet (died 1669) was an English baronet. He also held several government positions having served as governor of Exmouth and gentleman of the Privy Chamber, among others.

Biography
He was the son and heir of Edward Ameredeth (or Meredith) of Marston, Tamerton Foliot; the family was distantly related to Bishop Richard Meredith whose descendants were baronets in Ireland. He was created a Baronet of Nova Scotia on 2 June 1639 but never appears to have had seisin of any land in Nova Scotia. During the Civil War he was colonel of a troop of Horse and governor of Exmouth in the Royalist cause. An account show that he raised this troop at his own expense and served as lieutenant-colonel of a regiment until the end of the war. On the Restoration he was made a Gentleman of the Privy Chamber to King Charles II. He was Member of Parliament for Ballynakill from 1661 to 1666 and a commissioner of Customs and Excise in Ireland.

The baronet was married to Elizabeth, whose first husband was Francis Courtenay. He died on 5 December 1669 and was succeeded by his son William, who was a member of the British parliament representing Wigan (1754-1761) and Liverpool (1761-1780).

References

1669 deaths
People from Plymouth (district)
Baronets in the Baronetage of Nova Scotia
Cavaliers
Irish MPs 1661–1666
Members of the Parliament of Ireland (pre-1801) for Queen's County constituencies